3T3-L1 is a cell line derived from (mouse) 3T3 cells that is used in biological research on adipose tissue. 3T3-L1 cells have a fibroblast-like morphology, but, under appropriate conditions, the cells differentiate into an adipocyte-like phenotype.

3T3-L1 cells of the adipocyte morphology increase the synthesis and accumulation of triglycerides and acquire the signet ring appearance of adipose cells. These cells are also sensitive to lipogenic and lipolytic hormones, as well as drugs, including epinephrine, isoproterenol, and insulin.

Sources

External links
Cellosaurus entry for 3T3-L1

Rodent cell lines